Bengaluru Football Club  is an Indian professional football club based in Bengaluru, Karnataka. The club competes in the top league of Indian football, the Indian Super League. The club was established on 20 July 2013 and began their first competitive season in the I-League a few months later on 22 September 2013. Since their inception, the club has won two I-League titles, including one in their debut season, two Federation Cup titles, one Indian Super League title, and a Super Cup,durand cup ]]championship.

All time performance record
 
As of 27 January 2021

General

I-League

Indian Super League

AFC Champions League

AFC Cup

Players

Appearances
Record appearance maker: 206 – Sunil Chhetri
Most appearances in I-League: 101 – Sunil Chhetri 	
Most appearances in Indian Super League: 57 – Gurpreet Singh Sandhu 
Most appearances in Domestic Cup (Super Cup/Federation Cup ): 19 - Sunil Chhetri
Youngest player:  Damaitphang Lyngdoh  – 17 years 06 months 08 days 
Oldest player: Dimas Delgado – 37 years 10 months 15 days

Reference 

Indian football club statistics
India sport-related lists
Football in Karnataka